Jacques Cohen (October 13, 1930 – December 1, 2016) was an Israeli actor.

Biography
Cohen, who was born in Alexandria, Egypt, moved to Mandatory Palestine (present-day Israel) with his parents when he was just 5 years old. The family settled in Jerusalem, where Cohen became an actor during his 20s. Cohen first came to prominence with the amateur Circle Theater, in English, in Jerusalem, directed by Phillip Diskin. He played the lead in Jarry’s ‘Ubu Roi” for a year, 1965-1966. This was the first full length production to appear on the stage of the Tzavta Club in Tel-Aviv. He also performed the one-man play “Krapp’s Last Tape” by Samuel Beckett.

Cohen was best known for his starring role as Abu Rami, an Arab Israeli restaurant owner, on the sitcom HaMis'ada HaGdola, from 1985 until 1988. The show, which aired for three seasons, was created to appeal to both Jewish and non-Jewish television viewers in the surrounding region. Cohen, who was already an accomplished stage and television actor before HaMis'ada HaGdola, became so identified with his iconic role of Abu Rahmi that he later became a spokesperson for a major brand of hummus. Cohen spoke fluent Arabic and Hebrew, allowing him to play characters in both languages.

Cohen spoke Hebrew without an accent. The dialogue for his best known role as restaurateur Abu Rahmi on HaMis'ada HaGdola was mostly in Arabic, but also required lines in Hebrew, as well as other languages, including Japanese and Yiddish.

He played a Lebanese government minister in the 1986 American action film The Delta Force.

During the 2000s, Cohen opened his own restaurant in his hometown of Bitzaron.

Death
Cohen died from complications of pneumonia at a hospital in Rehovot, on December 1, 2016, at the age of 86. His death was announced by the country's Minister of Culture and Sports, Miri Regev. Cohen, a resident of Bitzaron, was survived by his wife and three children.

Partial filmography

La mestiza (1956)
Sayarim (1967)
Aserei Hahofesh (1968) - Prisoner
Le viol d'une jeune fille douce (1968) - Jacques
Hasamba (1971) - Police Officer
Harpatka'ot Yaldei Hahof (1971)
Bloomfield (1971) - Ariana Proprietor
Nurit (1972)
The Jerusalem File (1972) - Altouli 
Chamsin (1972) - Itzik, Chauffeur
Matana Mishamayim (1973)
Rak Hayom (1976)
Hamesh Ma'ot Elef Shahor (1977)
Gonev Miganav Patoor (1977)
Bo Nefotzetz Million (1977)
Belfer (1978)
Lo La'alot Yoter (1979) 
Ashanti (1979) - German at Slave Market
Hanna K. (1983) - Man at airport
Gesher Tzar Me'od (1985)
The Delta Force (1986) - Lebanese Minister
Every Time We Say Goodbye (1986) - Solomon
The Impossible Spy (1987) - Assan
Tel Aviv-Los Angeles (1988)
Talveh Li Et Ishteha (1988) - Sheikh Abu Antar
Summertime Blues: Lemon Popsicle VIII (1988) - Polly's Father
Delta Force 3: The Killing Game (1991) - Anwar Mossach 
Tipat Mazal (1992) - Morris 
The Mummy Lives (1993) - Lord Maxton
The Road to Glory (1997) - Marek the Manager
Aviva Ahuvati (2006) - Dr. Zahrir (final film role)

References

External links

1930 births
2016 deaths
People from Alexandria
Male actors from Jerusalem
Israeli male film actors
Israeli male television actors
Israeli male stage actors
Egyptian emigrants to Mandatory Palestine
Israeli people of Egyptian-Jewish descent
Jewish Israeli male actors
Egyptian Jews
20th-century Israeli male actors
Deaths from pneumonia in Israel